Tlanalapa is a town and one of the 84 municipalities of Hidalgo, in central-eastern Mexico. The municipality covers an area of 156.7 km².

As of 2020, the municipality had a total population of 8,062.

History
This was the center of the Tlanalapan state prior to the Spanish incursion.  It was a dependency of Otompa.  By 1521 the area was taken over by the Spanish.  During the colonial period it was part of Apa y Tepeapulco except for a short time around 1545 when it was the center of a separate jurisdiction.

References

Municipalities of Hidalgo (state)
Populated places in Hidalgo (state)
History of Mexico